Interstate 270 (I-270) makes up a large portion of the outer belt freeway in Greater St. Louis. The counterclockwise terminus of I-270 is at the junction with I-55 and I-255 in Mehlville, Missouri; the clockwise terminus of the freeway is at the junction with I-55 and I-70 north of Troy, Illinois.

I-270 between I-70 and I-55 was formerly designated I-244, a western bypass of St. Louis, Missouri. It was originally proposed by Missouri as I-144, but the road was a beltway (or part of one), so the American Association of State Highway and Transportation Officials (AASHTO) assigned it the number I-244. By the late 1970s, the entire beltway (including today's I-255) was integrated as a part of I-270 for consistency. However, the politicians in Illinois started planning their supplemental freeway system in the mid-1970s, and a  section of Corridor 413 was included into the Interstate Highway System in April 1978. This caused a potential place of confusion in Pontoon Beach, Illinois, where I-270 would have intersected itself, and eventually the Illinois Department of Transportation (IDOT) decided on the I-255 numbering in 1980 (but not before considering renumbering an  section to I-870).

Route description
In Missouri, I-270 diverges from at I-55 as a 10-lane freeway heading west of I-55's route but still maintaining a I-55's tendency to travel northward. I-270 intersects I-44 in a modified cloverleaf interchange that was rebuilt in the 1990s. I-270 meets up with I-64 with a stack interchange that was built from 1987 to 1993 (it was previously a cloverleaf that was a frequent source of backups).

From Dougherty Ferry Road through I-70, it continues as a 10-lane Interstate, although the right lanes often serve as exit lanes. The intersection with Route 340 (Olive Boulevard) was upgraded to a single-point urban interchange in the mid-2000s, and, during 2010–2011, the interchanges with Route 364 (Page Avenue) and Dorsett Road were upgraded with the latter becoming a diverging diamond interchange in October 2010. Congestion in this area is severe to the point the Missouri Department of Transportation (MoDOT) has spent millions on various traffic control improvements since the 1990s. One of the safety improvements is a "double white line" that motorists are not permitted to cross (violation of that could lead to a fine of $500) that is located at the exits for I-70 in the northbound lanes. Other safety implementations include a special Maryland Heights police cruiser that is dedicated to traffic enforcement on this section of I-270, congestion warning signs, and traffic cameras.

At I-70, I-270 makes a transition from a north–south highway to an east–west highway though not signed as such until James S. McDonnell Boulevard and will eventually become a six-lane highway by the time it reaches U.S. Route 67 (US 67, North Lindbergh Boulevard). It then meets I-170, which had its interchange rebuilt from 2001 to 2004 during which a left exit lane in the westbound lane was corrected. This section of I-270 was a source of frequent backups during the late-afternoon hours until the interchange was rebuilt. I-270 then passes various streets where every westbound exit connects to Dunn Road (and one must use Dunn Road to access I-270 with the only exceptions being the Route 367, Lilac Avenue, and Riverview Drive exits). Since Dunn Road handles two-way traffic, this has become a safety and congestion issue that MoDOT wants to address in the near future.

At Lilac Avenue, I-270 constricts to four lanes as it crosses the Mississippi River on the New Chain of Rocks Bridges. Leaving Missouri and entering Illinois, I-270 transitions from a suburban Interstate to an exurban Interstate with farm fields and wooded land bordering the Interstate in the area to the immediately east and west of the river crossing. Once it crosses the Chain of Rocks Canal, I-270 will intersect four different highways providing access to communities in eastern Madison County: Illinois Route 3 (IL 3), Old Alton Road, IL 203, and IL 111. The interchange with IL 3 is a partial cloverleaf with the loop ramps in the northeast and southeast quadrants. The remaining two are cloverleaf interchanges, with the Old Alton Road/IL 203 interchange using a collector–distributor system with two folded diamonds due to the presence of railroad tracks between the two roadways. The highway then reverts to a four-lane highway offering diamond interchanges with IL 157 and IL 159 before meeting up with I-55/I-70 at the interchange that IDOT refers as the "3 I's". The eastbound I-270 meets the northeastbound combination of I-55 and I-70 which leave the intersection as northbound I-55 and eastbound I-70 which has adopted I-270's mile markings.

History
The section of I-270 on the Missouri side was completed by June 1964, while the section that was I-244 was completed by November 1968. The section from IL 3 to I-55 in Illinois was finished by May 1965.

During the Great Flood of 1993, the New Chain of Rocks Bridge carrying I-270 over the Mississippi River was the only bridge open from St. Louis to Keokuk, Iowa, at one point. (All other bridges from the McKinley Bridge to the Keokuk Bridge were closed at the peak of that flood.)

The last major construction project on I-270 occurred from 1995 to 1998. Both MoDOT and IDOT upgraded I-270 to modern standards from Lilac Avenue to I-255. However, this section of I-270 is still at two lanes in each direction.

On September 13, 1999, a fatal accident involving a tractor-trailer occurred in the westbound lanes of I-270 in front of the now-defunct St. Thomas Aquinas-Mercy High School (now North County Christian School) in northern St. Louis County. This accident sped up efforts that led to the I-170/I-270 interchange reconstruction that went from 2001 to 2004.

A major accident and fire from a FedEx Ground truck between the Route 367 and Lilac Avenue exits on October 28, 2002, forced detours and lengthy delays.

There were plans to sign an  section of I-270 from Glen Carbon to Edwardsville as I-870. However, this idea was discarded.

In 2008, MoDOT implemented new variable speed limits on I-270/I-255 with the normal limit being . However, due to complaints from the public, these signs were planned to be updated in 2011 to advisory signs. A  section of I-270 between I-44 and Manchester was widened to five lanes in each direction, with work taking place between 2012 and 2013. This section of I-270 sees up to 185,000 vehicles per day, and peak hour congestion is common.

Constructions
IDOT wanted to widen I-270 from Lilac Avenue to I-255 from four lanes to six, but no money was available at the time of the proposal in 2007. However, IDOT has announced that nearly $100 million has been programmed for replacement of the canal bridges between 2011 and 2016. The canal bridges were replaced in mid-2014, and the old deck was imploded late 2015.

MoDOT has also identified the need of improving the I-270 corridor in northern St. Louis County, which could cost in the range of $200 million. The agency planned to widen the freeway from US 67 to Route 367 and rebuild every interchange (except I-170) and overpasses in this section. MoDOT held a public study of this corridor and has a website of this. Construction eventually began in spring 2020 and is expected to conclude in December 2023 at a price of under $300 million.

Exit list

See also

References

External links

70-2 Missouri-Illinois
2 Missouri
70-2
70-2
Roads in Greater St. Louis
Transportation in Madison County, Illinois
Transportation in St. Louis County, Missouri
270